The 1980 United States Senate election in Nevada was held on November 4, 1980. Incumbent Republican U.S. Senator Paul Laxalt won re-election to a second term. , this is the last time that the Republicans have won the Class 3 Senate seat from Nevada. 42 years later Laxalt's grandson and former Nevada Attorney General Adam Laxalt would run to take this senate seat in 2022, but narrowly lost to incumbent Democrat Catherine Cortez Masto.

Major candidates

Democratic 
 Mary Gojack, former State Senator (1974–1978) and former State Assemblywoman (1972–1974)

Republican 
 Paul Laxalt, incumbent U.S. Senator since 1975 and former Governor (1967–1971)

Results

See also 
 1980 United States Senate elections

References 

Nevada
1980
1980 Nevada elections